Charles Robert Hamilton Byron (10 April 1910 – 6 March 1952) was a South African cricketer who played first-class cricket for Border from 1928 to 1937.

An opening batsman, Robert Byron came to prominence when he scored 101 for a South African schoolboys team against the touring MCC team early in 1928. It was one of only three centuries scored against the MCC, compared to the 14 scored by MCC batsmen.

He played his first first-class match for Border later in 1928 and appeared frequently over nine years, but his success in his first-class career was modest except for his only century, 135 against Transvaal at Johannesburg in 1935–36.

References

External links

1910 births
1952 deaths
South African cricketers
Border cricketers
Sportspeople from Qonce